T'ula Kimray (Quechua t'ula a kind of plant (Baccharis (sp.)), kimray, kinray slope, "t'ula slope", also spelled Thola Quinray) is a  mountain in the Bolivian Andes. It is located in the Chuquisaca Department, Jaime Zudáñez Province, Icla Municipality.

References 

Mountains of Chuquisaca Department